Javad Nekounam (born 7 September 1980) is an Iranian retired professional footballer who played as a central midfielder and is the current manager of Foolad FC.

He spent most of his professional career with Pas and Spain's Osasuna, appearing in 197 official games and scoring 31 goals over his two spells with the latter club and also being team captain. He also competed in the United Arab Emirates, Kuwait and Qatar, in 18 seasons as a senior.

Nicknamed Neku, and widely regarded as one of Asia's greatest footballers, Nekounam represented the Iran national team a record of 148 times, playing several major tournaments including two World Cups and four Asian Cups.

Club career

Early years
Nekounam was born in Ray, Iran. Having played for Pas Tehran F.C. for several years, appearing in the AFC Champions League with the team, he signed a five-month contract with Al-Wahda F.C. in the United Arab Emirates for US$1 million, in 2005.

In January 2006, Nekounam joined Al Sharjah SC, although some European clubs such as 1. FC Kaiserslautern and Tottenham Hotspur had previously shown interest in him.

Osasuna

After his performance at the 2006 World Cup Nekounam was linked to the likes of Hertha BSC of the Bundesliga and Ligue 1's Olympique Lyonnais, but he eventually joined CA Osasuna on a two-year contract, with an option to a third year and a €5 million minimum release-fee clause – he thus became the first Iranian player to be signed by a Spanish club. On 22 February 2007, he scored in the 120th minute of the match against FC Girondins de Bordeaux in the knockout stages of the UEFA Cup to help to a 1–0 home win and aggregate score, and after a particularly successful first season began to attract interest from other European sides, notably Scotland's Rangers who had a £1 million pound offer rejected.

On 14 August 2007, Nekounam suffered an anterior cruciate ligament rupture in his right knee and, after undergoing a successful surgery in Augsburg, Germany, was sidelined for eight months. His number 24 was given to new signing Jaroslav Plašil, as he recovered from his injury.

Nekounam agreed to a three-year extension on 24 November 2007 as his contract that was set to end on 30 June 2008, with a €5 million buyout clause for the first two seasons and €2.5 million for the last. In February of the following year he made his first training appearance since the injury – incidentally, a week later, Xavier Margairaz suffered a similar injury, missing an estimate period that could amount to one year – and on 27 April he made his return against Valencia CF, coming on as a substitute for Francisco Puñal in the 70th minute of a 3–0 away loss.

On 31 August 2008, Nekounam scored Osasuna's first goal of the season, from the penalty spot in a 1–1 home draw against Villarreal CF. In November/December he also netted, but the Navarrese failed to win at Málaga CF (4–2 loss) and with Real Valladolid (3–3), also opening the score in the 3–1 away defeat to Real Madrid on 18 January 2009.

On 22 March 2009, Nekounam scored a last-minute goal for a 1–0 home victory over RCD Espanyol, and finished the season as the team's second scorer behind Walter Pandiani, scoring eight times in the league (a career-best in Spain). In summer 2009 he received offers from both Espanyol and Villarreal, with the latter in particular being ready to pay the release clause in his contract; however, the player repeatedly insisted to be "happy at the club", waiting until he "hears some better deals".

Nekounam was again a regular starter for Osasuna in the 2010–11 campaign, but also spent one month at the 2011 AFC Asian Cup with his national team. On 20 February 2011, in the second game upon his return from Qatar, he scored twice in a 4–0 home defeat of Espanyol, and eventually finished with six goals from 26 appearances in another escape from relegation.

On 21 May 2011, Nekounam renewed his contract with Osasuna for another two seasons, with the option of an annual renewal of his link. In July of the following year, amidst interest from Iranian club Esteghlal F.C. and unnamed Turkish and Qatari clubs, it was reported that he would only remain with at the El Sadar Stadium if he accepted a salary reduction – he was the highest-paid player.

Esteghlal

On 21 July 2012, aged almost 32, Nekounam returned to his country and signed a two-year deal with Esteghlal for a record fee of US$1,500,000, which made him the most expensive player in the Iran Pro League history. He scored his first goal for his new club in a 3–2 loss to Foolad F.C. on 28 November, through a penalty.

On 5 May 2013, against the same opponent, he also found the net, helping his team secure their 28th league title and winning his second national championship.

Al-Kuwait
On 14 January 2014, Nekounam agreed to a four-month contract at Kuwait SC. He scored his first goal for the club on 2 February, netting the only in an AFC Champions League qualifier against Al Shorta SC.

Nekounam scored three goals in the 2014 edition of the AFC Cup, and also won the season's Kuwait Emir Cup.

Return to Osasuna
On 4 August 2014, Nekounam returned to Osasuna by signing a two-year deal. He scored in his first game upon his return, a 3–1 Segunda División loss against Deportivo Alavés on 6 September. On 2 November he added another, helping to a 3–2 home victory over Real Betis.

Saipa
Nekounam returned to Iran and its Persian Gulf Pro League on 6 July 2015, joining Saipa F.C. for one year. He scored his first competitive goal for his new team on 6 August, the second in a 2–0 win at Rah Ahan Yazdan FC.

Al-Arabi
On 21 January 2016, Nekounam moved to Qatari club Al-Arabi SC on a four-month contract with an option to extend for a further year. In his first match, at home against Qatar SC, he assisted countryman Ashkan Dejagah in an eventual 1–1 draw.

Nekounam left on 30 June 2016, and the 35-year-old announced his retirement two weeks later.

International career

Nekounam received his first call-up to Iran in May 2000. He became a starter for the national side during the 2002 FIFA World Cup qualifiers and, already a key midfield element, played two of the national team's matches during the 2006 World Cup in Germany, being suspended for the final group game against Angola after his second yellow card against Portugal.

Additionally, Nekounam helped Iran win the 2002 Asian Games and the 2004 West Asian Football Federation Championship, and also represented the country in the 2004, 2007 and 2011 AFC Asian Cups. He was Team Mellis leading goalscorer in its successful 2014 World Cup qualifying campaign and, on 1 June 2014, he was selected by Carlos Queiroz for the finals in Brazil, where he captained the nation in an eventual group-stage exit.

Nekounam also made the 2015 Asian Cup squad, on 30 December 2014. In March 2015, he hinted that a friendly against Sweden on the 31st – five days earlier, against Chile, he had become his country's most capped player after surpassing Ali Daei– might be his last international, but later went back on that statement only to confirm it the following day and subsequently send an emotional open letter to fans; he scored 39 goals for his country, and shortly after retiring was named Queiroz's assistant.

Managerial career

Midway through the 2017–18 season, Nekounam became the manager of F.C. Nassaji Mazandaran. His team won 23 points from his nine games in charge, and were promoted to the Persian Gulf Pro League after a 24-year absence.

Career statistics
Club

International

Scores and results list Iran's goal tally first, score column indicates score after each Nekounam goal.

Managerial statistics

Honours

PlayerPasIran Pro League: 2003–04EsteghlalIran Pro League: 2012–13Al-KuwaitKuwait Emir Cup: 2013–14OsasunaSemi Final of 2006–07 UEFA CupIranWest Asian Football Federation Championship: 2004IndividualIran football award winners: Player of the Year
Asian Footballer of the Year nominee: 2013

ManagerNassaji MazandaranAzadegan League: runner-up (promotion) 2017–18Foolad'
Hazfi Cup: 2020–21
Iranian Super Cup: 2021

Notes

See also 
 List of men's footballers with 100 or more international caps
 Iranians in Spain

References

External links

profile at TeamMelli.com

 

1980 births
Living people
People from Ray, Iran
Iranian footballers
Association football midfielders
Persian Gulf Pro League players
Azadegan League players
Pas players
Esteghlal F.C. players
Saipa F.C. players
UAE Pro League players
Al Wahda FC players
Sharjah FC players
La Liga players
Segunda División players
CA Osasuna players
Kuwait SC players
Qatar Stars League players
Al-Arabi SC (Qatar) players
Iran under-20 international footballers
Iran international footballers
2004 AFC Asian Cup players
2006 FIFA World Cup players
2007 AFC Asian Cup players
2011 AFC Asian Cup players
2014 FIFA World Cup players
2015 AFC Asian Cup players
Footballers at the 2002 Asian Games
Medalists at the 2002 Asian Games
Asian Games medalists in football
Asian Games gold medalists for Iran
Iranian expatriate footballers
Expatriate footballers in the United Arab Emirates
Expatriate footballers in Spain
Expatriate footballers in Kuwait
Expatriate footballers in Qatar
Iranian expatriate sportspeople in the United Arab Emirates
Iranian expatriate sportspeople in Spain
Iranian expatriate sportspeople in Qatar
FIFA Century Club
Iranian football managers
Iranian expatriate sportspeople in Kuwait
F.C. Nassaji Mazandaran managers
Foolad F.C. managers
Persian Gulf Pro League managers